Allen High School is a public, co-educational secondary school in Allen, Texas (United States). It is the only high school in the Allen Independent School District.

Allen High School serves most of the city of Allen. Until fall 2006, when Lovejoy High School opened, Allen High School served high school students in the Lovejoy Independent School District, which includes the city of Lucas, most of Fairview, and a small portion of Plano.

History
The first Allen High School, built in 1910 at the corner of Belmont and Cedar, was a two-story brick building housing six classrooms and an auditorium, and saw the first graduating class of eight students in 1914.

The second Allen High School was established in 1959 on land donated by Mr. Harris Brown on the corner of Jupiter and Main Streets.

August 1999 saw the opening of Allen High School "2000," a new facility (at the corner of Greenville and Rivercrest) which opened to 2,200 students in grades 10 through 12. The former high school was converted into the Becky Lowery Freshman Center, named in honor of a former middle school teacher and school counselor. In 2018, the building was partly demolished and replaced with a new building on an adjacent plot of land on Greenville Ave. The southernmost part of the school was renovated into the Dillard Special Achievement Center, while the northern section became a parking lot. The football stadium still stands. The new building started serving grade 9 students during the 2018–19 school year, and had an enrollment of 1,634 in 2015–16. The final expansion of the school was completed in 2011. The expansion included a new 1,500 seat performing arts center, an expansion of band hall space and a Career and Technology Education center featuring a student-managed restaurant open to the public, a student-managed apparel store with student-designed items, multiple new Mac labs, Mac-equipped rooms for the photojournalism, yearbook, commercial photography, audiovisual, radio, and newspaper classes as well as learning-classrooms for the medical education programs.

Location
Freshman Center (9): 368 N Greenville Ave, Allen, TX 75002
Main campus (10–12): 300 Rivercrest Blvd. Allen, TX 75002

Academics

Allen High School offers the International Baccalaureate program to its students, with the class of 2002 being the first to graduate Full Diploma. AHS also provides Advanced Placement, Dual Credit, and elective courses. AP course enrollment at AHS is 53%.

Allen uses an 8:50 a.m. to 4:10 p.m. modified block schedule. The period schedule includes five standard periods per day, though students are required to be present for only four in 10th grade, and only three in 11th or 12th grade.

Allen High School was named a 2001–02 National Blue Ribbon School and a 2004 TEA Pathfinder School.

Extracurricular activities

Athletics
 Allen High has the largest University Interscholastic League (UIL) athletic program of any Texas high school.

Programs include:

 Archery
 Baseball
 Basketball (men's and women's)
 Bowling
 Cheerleading
 Cross Country
 Drill team (dance team)
 Football
 Golf (men's and women's)
 Hockey
 Lacrosse (men's and women's)
 Marching Band
 Rugby (men's)
 shooting team
 Soccer
 Softball
 Spikeball
 Swim and dive
 Table tennis
 Tennis
 Track and field
 Volleyball (men's and women's)
 Wrestling

Football
The Allen Eagle football program has become one of the top football programs in Texas over the past decade, with playoff berths in every season since 2001, and a district title every season since 2006  In 2014, Allen became the fourth high school in state history to win the state championship 3 years in a row while being the first to do so in the state's largest classification.

In 2006 the varsity football team finished its season as the District 9-5A Champions by beating Plano East in the last game of the regular season, 22–17. Its only loss was to Garland in the season opener. In the playoffs the Allen Eagles beat Rowlett, Mesquite, Round Rock, and Spring Westfield, and made it to the state semifinals where they lost to Southlake Carroll. The team's regular season record was 9–1 with an overall record of 13–2.

After finishing the 2008 regular season with a record of 9–1, the Eagles beat South Grand Prairie, Coppell, Odessa Permian, Euless Trinity, Round Rock Stony Point, and Fort Bend Hightower in the state championship to earn their first-ever state title, making them Texas' Class 5A Div I State Champions. Upon winning the championship, the Allen Eagles were ranked #2 in the nation by both ESPN Rise and Yahoo! Rivals High School rankings, and they were ranked #5 by MaxPreps poll.

The 2012 season marked the beginning of a record-setting win streak for the Eagles. Allen went 15–1 on the season, only losing to Coppell early in the season.

Allen won the Class 5A Division I football state championship game 35–21 against Houston Lamar, at Cowboys Stadium in Arlington, on December 22, 2012.

Allen won the Class 5A Division I football state championship game 63–28 against Pearland High School at AT&T Stadium in Arlington, on December 21, 2013.

Allen won the Class 6A Division I football state championship game 47–16 against Cypress Ranch High School at AT&T Stadium in Arlington, on December 20, 2014.

Allen went 10–0 in the 2015 regular season but lost in the Division I State semi-final to Westlake High School (Texas), snapping a program-best 57-game winning streak, the 2nd longest ever in the state of Texas (the longest being 68 games, set by Celina High School.)

Allen won the Class 6A Division I football championship game 35–33 against Lake Travis High School at AT&T Stadium in Arlington, on December 23, 2017.

Allen was named national champs by High School Football America after the 2012, 2013  and 2014 seasons.

New stadium 

Due to the program's popularity and student population, the school was authorized, via an approved April 2009 referendum, to build an 18,000-seat stadium (Allen Eagle Stadium) for the team.  The stadium (which cost nearly $60 million) opened for the 2012 football season. It is the fifth largest high school stadium in the state, but the largest designed for the use of only one team. The new facility houses a weight room, wrestling practice facility, and indoor golfing facility.

On February 27, 2014, the stadium was closed due to cracking in concrete making it unsafe to use. The 2014 varsity football season played every game on the road, and still managed to go undefeated and win their third consecutive title earning the nickname "Road Warriors" by the local media.

After about $10 million in structural and design repairs by Pogue Construction and PBK (neither the district nor the Allen citizens having to pay anything extra), Allen's stadium was officially reopened on June 5, 2015, for its Class of 2015 graduation and allowed the varsity football team to once again host home games.

Other athletic programs

The Allen High School girls' golf program achieved the first UIL state championship for the school by winning the state tournament in 2005. The team followed this with another state win in 2006 and also in 2012.

The Allen Eagles wrestling team won the THSCA dual state tournament in the 2008–09 season, defeating the defending UIL state champions Randall High School. The Eagle wrestling team also won the THSCA dual state tournament and UIL state tournament in the 2009–10 season, the 2010–11 season, the 2011–12 season, the 2012–13 season, the 2013–14 season, the 2014–15 season, the 2015–16 season, the 2016–2017 season, the 2017–2018 season, and the 2018–2019 season.

The Allen High School boys' bowling team won the 2001–02 and 2007–08 Texas High School Bowling Club Team Championships. The Allen girls' team was the state champion in 2003–04 and 2004–2005, becoming the first Texas boys' or girls' teams to repeat as state champions. The girls' bowling team won its third state championship against Plano East in the 2008–09 school year.

The Allen High School varsity hockey team won the 2006–07, 2008–09, and 2016–17 Texas State Championship, and the 2009 Rocky Mountain Regional Championship. The team placed second in the 2009–10 State Championship and was a quarterfinalist at the National Championships.

The girls' soccer team advanced to the state tournament in 1989, the team's inaugural season, and again in 1990, 1998 and 2019. The boys' program made it to the 1993, 1996 and 1997 regional finals.

In the 2008–09 school year, Allen High School was the state champion in football, hockey, girls' bowling and wrestling.

In 2011, Allen High School won 1st place in Culinary at the Texas ProStart Competition in Austin, TX. They then advanced to and placed 17th at the National ProStart Competition.

In the 2013–14 season Allen High School's basketball program went to the state championship for the first time in 50 years. Then, in the 2017–18 season, Allen boys won its first state championship in the school's history.

The Allen High School archery team has won the Texas Archery in the School state championship in 2014 and 2015.

The Allen High School shooting team won the overall SCTP national championship in 2014.

The Allen High School Varsity Hockey team came in 2nd place in the 2020 State Champions, losing to Jesuit, its longtime rival.

Band
The Allen Escadrille claims to be the country's largest high school marching band, with a membership of over 800 students. They play for the 6A football team, participate in competitions and perform in parades and other venues. The Escadrille was invited to perform in the St. Patrick's Day Parade in Honolulu, Hawaii, in 2009, and performed in the 2006 Rose Parade as well as the 2016 Rose Parade in Pasadena, California. It received the Sudler Shield Award from the John Philip Sousa Foundation in 2004. It was also a participant in the 1994 St. Patrick's Day Parade in Dublin, Ireland, being the only high school band chosen to play at the Dublin Lord Mayors Ball; the 1995 and 1999 Texas Gubernatorial Parades; and the 1997 Macy's Thanksgiving Day Parade in New York City. The Allen Eagle Escadrille won the 4A State Marching Band Competition in back-to-back years in 1987 and 1988.

Programs
Allen High School received the 2011 Grammy Signature School Gold Award, which recognizes U.S. public high schools making an outstanding commitment to music education during an academic school year.

The Allen Eagle Chorale Choir was invited to perform at the Texas Music Educators Association's annual convention during the 2011–2012 school year. A recording of their performance was published to Spotify in 2012. The TMEA event covers all Texas Independence School Districts and invites by audition only the top 5 schools in the state. They have again been invited this coming year.

Allen High School also has a broadcast program, KGLE 3 Teen News. Between 1996 and 2006, the program had five first places Best of Shows, two-second places, one-third place, one-eighth place, and one not placed at the National Scholastic Press Association's biannual competition. it has also been a Pacemaker, finalist, five times. The KGLE broadcast program includes radio broadcast.

The Allen Orchestra was invited to perform at The International Midwest Clinic and Convention in 2006.

Allen High School's photography program won ATPI's Top Program contest in 2006.

The school's German folk dancing team took first place in the 2005 state competition and third place in state finals in 2006.

The Allen Clinical Rotation Program received a new technology lab.

In the spring of 2011, Allen High School's Rugby team was runner-up in the Division 2 State Championship in Houston Texas.

In the spring of 2022, Allen High School's UIL Academics team was runner-up in the 6A Academic UIL State Competition.

Notable alumni
 A.J. Ferrari (2020), freestyle and folkstyle wrestler
 Allison Ponthier (2015), musician
 Amanda Dunbar (2000), artist
 Laura Bailey (1999), voice actress
 Bo Nickal (2014), UFC fighter, freestyle and folkstyle wrestler, Dan Hodge Trophy winner, 3× NCAA Wrestling Champion for Penn State
 Bobby Evans (2015), NFL player and founder of Feed The Family Apparel
 Carly Patterson (2006), 2004 Olympic All-Around Champion in artistic gymnastics, member of the USA Gymnastics Hall of Fame
 Cedric Ogbuehi (2010), NFL player
 Christian Sam (2014), NFL player
 Dan Buckner (2008), former CFL player
 Greg Little (2016), offensive lineman for Ole Miss and the Carolina Panthers
 J. D. Walton (2005), former NFL player
 Jalen Guyton (2015), wide receiver for the Los Angeles Chargers
 Jim Parrack (1999), actor
 Jonathan Williams (2012), NFL player
 Julie McCullough (1983), former Playboy centerfold, actress, stand-up comedian
 Kyler Murray (2015), current Arizona Cardinals quarterback, former Oklahoma quarterback, 2018 Heisman Trophy winner, first overall pick in the 2019 NFL Draft
 Levi Onwuzurike (2016), NFL player
 Matt "Zyos" Leto (2002), retired professional Halo player and game designer
 Matt Barr (2002), actor
 Pat McCarty (2000), former professional cyclist
 Shawn Tolleson (2006), MLB pitcher
 Steven Terrell (2009), former NFL player
 Tejan Koroma (2014), NFL player
 Uzoma Nwachukwu (2009), NFL player
 William Sherman (2018), NFL player

References

External links
 Allen Independent School District
 

High schools in Collin County, Texas
Public high schools in Texas
Buildings and structures in Allen, Texas
International Baccalaureate schools in Texas
1910 establishments in Texas
Educational institutions established in 1910